Portwrinkle is a small coastal village in south-east Cornwall, England, United Kingdom. It is at the western end of Whitsand Bay five miles (8 km) south-west of Saltash.

Portwinkle was traditionally a fishing village and the old 17th century walls of the pilchard cellars are still standing, although they have been incorporated into housing. The village has a harbour and two beaches are accessible from it. Although the village has no shops, apart from the beach car park cafe, there is a post office in nearby village of Crafthole. 

The Whitsand Bay Hotel – formerly a mansion called Thanckes House in nearby Torpoint, dismantled and re-erected in Portwrinkle – closed in 2018 but the Grade II listed building still stands, awaiting redevelopment.

Eglarooze Cliff
Eglarooze Cliff, to the west of the village, is designated a Site of Special Scientific Interest for its biological interest. The cliff is noted to contain 2 Red Data Book endangered plant species; the slender bird's-foot trefoil and carrot broomrape.

References

External links

Villages in Cornwall
Fishing communities in England
Sites of Special Scientific Interest in Cornwall